William Lee Wilder (August 22, 1904 – February 14, 1982) was an Austrian-American screenwriter, film producer and director. He was the brother of the film director Billy Wilder and father of television comedy writer and producer Myles Wilder.

Biography

Wilder originally was a NY-based maker of purses, Wm. Wilder Co., Inc. Original Handbags, before heading to Hollywood in 1945 to produce movies.

There he started his own film production company and produced his first film The Great Flamarion in 1945 and directed his first film The Glass Alibi the following year.

From 1949 to 1950, Wilder directed, wrote and produced 16 musical short subjects featuring traditional spirituals and folk-music.

During the 1950s Wilder formed a film production company called Planet Filmplays where he produced and directed several low budget science fiction films with screenplays cowritten by his son Myles.

Selected filmography
 The Glass Alibi (1946)
 The Pretender (1947)
 Yankee Fakir (1947)
 The Vicious Circle (1948) (also known as Woman in Brown)
 Once a Thief (1950)
 Three Steps North (1951)
 Phantom from Space (1953)
 Killers from Space (1954)
 The Snow Creature (1954)
 The Big Bluff (1955)
 Fright (1956)
 Manfish (1956) (also known as Calypso)
 The Man Without a Body (1957)
 Spy in the Sky! (1958)
 Bluebeard's Ten Honeymoons (1960)
 Caxambu (1967)
 The Omegans (1968)

References

External links

1904 births
1982 deaths
American film directors
American male screenwriters
American film producers
Austrian emigrants to the United States
Austrian Jews
Science fiction film directors
20th-century American businesspeople
20th-century American male writers
20th-century American screenwriters